Turris condei is a species of sea snail, a marine gastropod mollusk in the family Turridae, the turrids.

Description
The length of the shell attains 59 mm.

Distribution
This marine species occurs off Mozambique

References

 Vera-Pelaez, J. L., Vega-Luz, R. & Lozano-Francisco, M. C. (2000). Five new species of the genus Turris Roding, 1798 (Gastropoda; Turridae; Turrinae) of the Philippines and one new species of the southern Indo-Pacific. Malakos [Revista de la Asociacióon Malacolóogica Andaluza]. Monografia 2, 1-29.
 Kilburn R.N., Fedosov A.E. & Olivera B.M. (2012) Revision of the genus Turris Batsch, 1789 (Gastropoda: Conoidea: Turridae) with the description of six new species. Zootaxa 3244: 1-58.

condei
Gastropods described in 2000